Lev (Chaim-Leib) Yakovlevich Sternberg (Zhitomir, Russian Empire – August 14, 1927, Dudergof, now Mozhaisky, Soviet Union) was a Russian and Soviet ethnographer of Jewish origin who from 1889 to 1897 studied the Nivkhs (Gilyaks), Oroks, and Ainu on Sakhalin and in Siberia for the American Museum of Natural History, in New York City.

Biography 
Sternberg majored in physics and mathematics at Saint Petersburg State University. He later majored in law at Novorossiisk University. He was an activist who joined Narodnaya Volya (The People's Will) and edited the publication Vestnik Narodnoi Voli (The Narodnaya Volya Herald). He was not a Marxist. He was arrested by Russian authorities April 27, 1886 for participation in The People's Will which was labeled an anti-tsarist terrorist organization spending three years in an Odessa jail. Sternberg was then exiled to the Sakhalin penal colony for a ten-year prison sentence. He was deported from Odessa on the boat Peterburg on March 19, 1889, arriving in Port Aleksandrovsk, Sakhalin, on May 19, 1889. Sternberg agitated authorities due to his activism with regard to prisoners' and indigenous peoples' rights. Authorities sent him to the remote community of Viakhtu, 100 km north of Port Aleksandrovsk, where he first began his ethnographic fieldwork on the Nivkhs, Oroks, and Ainu. He would return home but be put under house arrest for the first few years.

Lev Sternberg was an important Russian figure in the then new field of anthropology. Sternberg, with the help of Vladimir Bogoraz organized the first Russian ethnography center at Saint Petersburg State University after the 1917 Russian Revolution.

Footnotes

References

Merriam-Webster (1995) Merriam-Webster's Biographical Dictionary; 1st edition. Merriam-Webster. 1184p 
Shternberg, Lev Iakovlevich and Bruce Grant. (1999) The Social Organization of the Gilyak. New York: American Museum of Natural History. Seattle: University of Washington Press 280p. 
Smolyak, A. V. (2001) Traditional Principles of Natural Resources Use among Indigenous Peoples of the Lower Amur River. Journal of Legal Pluralism Num. 46

External links
  http://memory.pvost.org/pages/shteinberglya.html
  https://archive.today/20070928141838/http://www.pgpb.ru/cd/primor/first/shter.htm

1861 births
1927 deaths
Writers from Zhytomyr
Ukrainian ethnographers
Corresponding Members of the Russian Academy of Sciences (1917–1925)
Corresponding Members of the USSR Academy of Sciences
Ukrainian Jews
Members of the Grand Orient of Russia's Peoples
Narodnaya Volya